The Scout and Guide movement in the Gambia is served by
 The Gambia Girl Guides Association, member of the World Association of Girl Guides and Girl Scouts
 The Gambia Scout Association, member of the World Organization of the Scout Movement

See also